Nina Aleksandrovna Gruzintseva (7 April 1934 – 17 October 2021) was a Russian Soviet sprint canoer who had her best achievements on the 500 m distance in doubles (K-2 500 m). In this event she won a world title in 1958 and two European titles in 1957 and 1961; she finished fifth at the 1964 Summer Olympics. She also won European medals in the single and quad kayak events. Between 1955 and 1968 she won 18 national titles. After retiring from competitions she worked as a referee, particularly at the 1980 Summer Olympic Games.

References

1934 births
2021 deaths
Canoeists at the 1964 Summer Olympics
Olympic canoeists of the Soviet Union
Soviet female canoeists
Russian female canoeists
Honoured Masters of Sport of the USSR
Sportspeople from Saint Petersburg